Lepidozamia hopei is a species of cycad in the family Zamiaceae. Its English common name is Hope's cycad. It is endemic to the Australian state of Queensland. It is the largest known species of cycad.

References

External links
 
 

hopei
Endemic flora of Australia
Flora of Queensland
Cycadophyta of Australia
Least concern biota of Queensland
Least concern flora of Australia
Taxa named by Eduard August von Regel
Taxonomy articles created by Polbot